The 2019 U23 World Wrestling Championships were the third edition of U23 World Wrestling Championships of combined events, held from October 28 to November 3 in Budapest, Hungary.

Medal table

Team ranking

Medal summary

Men's freestyle

Men's Greco-Roman

Women's freestyle

References

External links 
 Official website
 Schedule
 Results book (Archived version)

World Wrestling U23 Championships
International wrestling competitions hosted by Hungary
International sports competitions in Budapest
World U23 Wrestling Championship
World U23 Wrestling Championship
World U23 Wrestling Championships